Emma Raducanu  (born 13 November 2002) is a British professional tennis player. She reached a career-high ranking of No. 10 by the Women's Tennis Association (WTA) on 11 July 2022, and is the current British No. 1. Raducanu is the first British woman to win a Grand Slam singles title since Virginia Wade at the 1977 Wimbledon Championships.

Raducanu was born in Toronto and raised in London. She made her WTA Tour debut in June 2021. With a wildcard entry at Wimbledon, ranked outside the top 300, she reached the fourth round in her first major tournament. At the 2021 US Open, Raducanu became the first singles qualifier in the Open Era to win a Grand Slam title, beating Leylah Fernandez in the final without dropping a set in the tournament. It was the second Grand Slam tournament of her career; she holds the Open Era record for the fewest majors played before winning a title.

Personal life and education
Emma Raducanu was born on 13 November 2002 in Toronto, Canada, and was raised in Bromley, England. Her father Ion Răducanu is from Bucharest, Romania, and her mother Renee Zhai (Dongmei) is from Shenyang, China. She has said that her parents "both came from very academic families... [in] communist countries so education was kind of their only option". Both of her parents work in the finance sector.

Her family moved to England when she was two years old, and she holds both British and Canadian citizenship. She is fluent in Mandarin and almost fluent in Romanian; her grandmothers live in Bucharest and Northeast China. Raducanu started playing tennis at the age of five, while also participating in various other sports and activities as a child, such as basketball, golf, karting, motocross, skiing, horse riding and ballet. Raducanu is a fan of Formula One and the football club Tottenham Hotspur.

She attended Bickley Primary School followed by Newstead Wood School, a selective grammar school in Orpington, where she obtained an A* in mathematics and an A in economics in her A-Levels. Raducanu has stated she would like to become as athletic as Simona Halep, and aspires to the mentality and sporting ethics of Li Na.

On 28 January 2022, a man named Amrit Magar was found guilty of stalking Raducanu at her home. Raducanu said that the incidents made her feel unsafe in her house and concerned to go out alone. On 23 February 2022, the offender was sentenced to a community order, and also given a five-year restraining order imposing conditions.

Junior career

Raducanu made her International Tennis Federation (ITF) debut in Liverpool at the Nike Junior International (Grade-5 event) after having entered on her 13th birthday, the earliest allowed age of entry. She subsequently won the tournament eight days later and became the youngest ever winner of an ITF Under-18 tournament. Her ITF junior success continued in 2017 with two titles in February at the Yonex ITF Hamburg and ITF Oslo Open Grade-4 events.

Raducanu won the ITF Chandigarh Lawn Tennis girls' tournament in January 2018. In 2018, she won ITF Grade-3 at Chandigarh and Grade-2 junior tournaments at New Delhi both in India. Raducanu defeated Diana Khodan of Ukraine in the final at Chandigarh, held at the Lawn Tennis Association Stadium, where she won in straight sets.  She won two additional titles the following month, four in total for 2018 and seven over the course of her junior career, with wins at the Biotehnos Cup and Šiauliai Open Grade-2 events.

Later that year, she reached the girls' singles quarterfinals at both the Wimbledon Championships and the US Open. At Wimbledon, Raducanu defeated Leylah Fernandez in the second round, a victory she would repeat in the (senior) US Open final three years later.

Raducanu turned professional in 2018. She alternated between junior and professional tournaments during 2018 and 2019.

Professional career

2018–2020: ITF Circuit and Fed Cup

Raducanu made her debut on the ITF Women's circuit in 2018 and secured her first title of the year in May at the $15,000 ITF Tiberias. She finished the season with a second $15,000 title in October at the ITF Antalya.

In 2019, Raducanu competed in Maharashtra, India. She retired in the second round of the $25K Solapur Open.
She won a $25K event in Pune, India, in December; in the final at Deccan Gymkhana Ground, she won against Naiktha Bains in three sets. Her semifinal and quarterfinal victories came in three sets. In the Fed Cup (eventually Billie Jean King Cup) in 2019, she was a hitting partner for the British team. She was then selected to play for the team in 2020 Qualifying after Johanna Konta withdrew to focus on the Olympics. At the time, Raducanu was described as "the British player with the most potential of her generation". She would have partnered Bains in the doubles qualifiers against Slovakia, but the match was not played. Asked about being called up to the British team as a teenager, Raducanu said "Being a bit of the underdog is great because you can go out there with no fear."

In 2020, many tennis events were cancelled due to the COVID-19 pandemic. Raducanu participated in exhibition matches and small tournaments in the United Kingdom. She won the Lawn Tennis Association LTA British Tour Masters title in December 2020. She also devoted time to her academic studies, preparing for her A Level examinations, which she took in 2021.

2021: US Open title and top 20
Raducanu began training with coach Nigel Sears at the end of April 2021. At the beginning of June, Raducanu made her WTA Tour main-draw debut at the Nottingham Open as a wildcard entry. She lost in the first round to Briton Harriet Dart.

In late June, Raducanu made her Grand Slam main-draw debut on a wildcard to the Wimbledon Championships. She advanced to the third round with initial victories over Vitalia Diatchenko and Markéta Vondroušová. She was the youngest British woman to reach the Wimbledon third round since Elena Baltacha in 2002. She then defeated Sorana Cîrstea to reach the fourth round, becoming the youngest British woman to reach the last 16 in the Open Era, and entering into the top 200. Raducanu retired in the second set of her fourth round match against Ajla Tomljanović, after experiencing breathing difficulties and sickness.

In July, Raducanu changed her coach from Sears to Andrew Richardson, one of her youth coaches. Richardson was chosen to coach Raducanu through the US Open Series. Raducanu then played at the Silicon Valley Classic, the first women's tournament in the annual US Open Series, in August after again receiving a wildcard to enter the tournament; she lost in the first round to Zhang Shuai. She reached the final of the WTA 125 event in Chicago, where she lost to Clara Tauson. The WTA ranking points she gained brought her to a new career-high ranking of world No. 150.

At the US Open, Raducanu entered the main draw as a qualifier. Raducanu, ranked 150th in the world, had to play three matches in the qualifying tournament to get into the main draw. In the main draw she defeated Stefanie Vögele, Zhang Shuai, Sara Sorribes Tormo, Shelby Rogers, Belinda Bencic, Maria Sakkari and Leylah Fernandez to win the US Open.  On her way to the title she advanced to the semi-finals without dropping a set, and became the fifth player in the open era to reach a grand slam semifinal as a qualifier. In progressing to the final of the US Open, Raducanu entered the top 25 and became British No. 1. She became the fifth player in the Open Era to make the semifinal on her US Open debut, and the first British woman to reach the US Open final since Virginia Wade in 1968. Raducanu defeated Leylah Fernandez in two sets, winning with a 109-mph ace, in what was the first all-teenage women's singles final since the 1999 US Open. She won the title without dropping a set, the first woman to do so at the US Open since Williams in 2014. Raducanu was the first qualifier (male or female) to win a Grand Slam tournament in the Open Era. As a result of her US Open victory, Raducanu rose to No. 23 in the rankings, a jump of 332 places from the start of the year. Raducanu received congratulatory messages from a number of notable figures, including Elizabeth II and Catherine, Duchess of Cambridge. 
Less than two weeks after her victory at the US Open, Raducanu chose not to extend her coaching arrangement with Richardson. She entered the Indian Wells Open in October 2021, accepting a wildcard place in the main draw. Although she was without a coach, former British No. 1 Jeremy Bates aided her at the event. Raducanu lost in straight sets in her first match against Aliaksandra Sasnovich. After her loss in Indian Wells, she withdrew from the Kremlin Cup citing schedule changes.

Later in October, Raducanu entered the Transylvania Open, in Cluj-Napoca, Romania, as the third seed. There, she earned her first WTA Tour victory by defeating Polona Hercog. She advanced to the quarterfinals by defeating Ana Bogdan, before losing to Marta Kostyuk in straight sets. Her last WTA Tour event of 2021 was the Linz Open, which she entered as the top seed for the first time. She lost in her round of 16 match against Wang Xinyu, in three sets. Shortly after the tournament, she announced she had hired a permanent coach, naming Torben Beltz to the position.

After finishing 2021 WTA Tour at a career high of world No. 19, Raducanu participated in an exhibition match against Elena-Gabriela Ruse at the Champions Tennis event in the Royal Albert Hall on 28 November 2021 and won in two sets. She was scheduled to play Bencic in another exhibition at the Mubadala Championship, before withdrawing after testing positive for COVID-19.

2022: Full year on tour, top 10, injury issues

Raducanu was set to start the season at the Melbourne Summer Set, but withdrew, citing her recent bout of COVID-19. She began the season at the Sydney International with a lopsided loss to Elena Rybakina in the first round. She reached her career-high singles ranking of No. 18 on 10 January 2022 and made her Australian Open debut as the 17th seed, where she defeated 2017 US Open champion and former world No. 3 Sloane Stephens in the first round. She was defeated by Danka Kovinić in the second round, putting the loss down to a blister on her racquet hand. On 14 February 2022, she climbed to a new career-high singles ranking of 12. At the Abierto Zapopan, she retired in her first-round match against Daria Saville in the third set, due to an injury acquired during the over three-and-a-half-hour match, the then-longest of the WTA season, after having served for the match a set earlier. She subsequently withdrew from the Monterrey Open due to the reported "small left leg injury".

This season marked her first appearance in the "Sunshine Double" (Miami and Indian Wells Opens), after having only played at Indian Wells before. Her only success came at the Indian Wells Open with a victory over former world No. 4 Caroline Garcia in her first match before losing in the subsequent round. The early hardcourt season concluded with a first-match loss in her Miami Open debut.

In March, she was announced on the British team for the Billie Jean King Cup qualifiers; the matches marked her first time playing in the competition, as well as her first match of the season on clay. She debuted as Great Britain's top seed in a tie against the Czech Republic. She secured her first professional victory on clay in her first match of the tournament against Tereza Martincová in straight sets. She was defeated by Markéta Vondroušová in her second match of the qualifying tournament after suffering blister issues on her right foot. Following this, her season continued with a WTA clay season debut at the Stuttgart Open in April where she secured her first WTA Tour victory on clay against Storm Sanders in the first round. She advanced to her first quarterfinals in a WTA 500 level event and was defeated by world No. 1, Iga Świątek. This was her first match against a No. 1 ranked player.

After only five months of working together, Raducanu announced a split from her coach Torben Beltz to use a new training model with the Lawn Tennis Association (LTA) supporting in the interim.  This change included the addition of LTA coach Louis Cayer as a consultant on her technique, particularly serves, having worked together since early April. In May, Raymond Sarmiento began working as her hitting partner. She was aided by Iain Bates of the LTA in place of a coach in her debut at the Madrid Open. After the Stuttgart quarterfinals appearance, the remainder of her clay-court season saw little success with early round exits at the Madrid Open, Italian Open, and in her debut at the French Open, where she lost to Aliaksandra Sasnovich.  This included a first-round retirement at the Italian Open against former world No. 4 and 2019 US Open champion, Bianca Andreescu, after carrying a back injury into the match.

The grass-court season began at the Nottingham Open where she faced Viktorija Golubic in the first round. After only 33 minutes into the first set, she retired due to injury. Raducanu had been expected to enter as a top 20 wildcard into Eastbourne, but did not enter due to the ongoing injury. Nevertheless, she entered Wimbledon, where she was seeded 10th. She was defeated by Caroline Garcia in the second round after a first round win over Alison Van Uytvanck. She reached the top 10 in the rankings on 11 July 2022.

Raducanu started the US Open Series by entering the Washington Open in August. Seeded second, she advanced to her second quarterfinals of the season where she was defeated after playing the longest two-set match of the 2022 season a round earlier. Raducanu also made her professional doubles debut at the tournament with Clara Tauson, losing in the first round. She also started working with coach Dmitry Tursunov on a trial basis. She debuted at the Canadian Open where she was defeated by 2021 tournament winner Camila Giorgi in the first round. The summer hardcourt season continued with a third round loss at the Cincinnati Open after lopsided wins against former world No. 1 players Serena Williams and Victoria Azarenka. She became the first player in history to win a bagel set against both Williams and Azarenka. Raducanu entered the 2022 US Open as the defending champion, seeded 11th. In her opening round match, Raducanu lost to Alizé Cornet in straight sets and became the third woman in US Open history to lose her opening match in the year after winning the title. Having failed to defend any of the points she earned with the title last year, Raducanu fell outside of the top 80 in the rankings.

The early US Open exit was followed by a second round loss at the Slovenia Open where she received a medical time-out to tend to her left leg. At the Korea Open, Raducanu advanced to her first semifinal of the season where she retired in the third set to top seed Jeļena Ostapenko due to a left glute injury. This was her fourth mid-match retirement of the season. After a first round exit at the Ostrava Open, her WTA season ended after withdrawing from the Transylvania Open and Guadalajara Open citing a wrist injury.  Following this, the coaching trial with Tursunov concluded without an extension and fitness trainer Jez Green was added to the team.  The wrist injury also led to a withdrawal from the Billie Jean King Cup Finals a few weeks later. After finishing the season ranked at world No. 75, she was defeated by world No. 2 Ons Jabeur in an exhibition match at the Mubadala World Tennis Championship where she also started working with Sebastian Sachs as her new coach on a trial basis.

2023 
Ranked 78, Raducanu returned to the tour at the Auckland Open in January. After defeating Czech teenager Linda Fruhvirtová in the first round, she retired in the second round after sustaining a left ankle injury. Having recovered with a short turnaround for the Australian Open, she advanced to the second round where she was defeated by world No. 7 Coco Gauff. Following an over month long recovery and training session after Australia, the planned return to tour at the ATX Open was cut short after withdrawing due to tonsillitis. She subsequently withdrew from an exhibition event at Indian Wells to continue preparations for the main tournament. Despite a return of her wrist problems from last season, she entered the Indian Wells Open and advanced to the fourth round defeating Danka Kovinic, 20th seed Magda Linette and 13th seed Beatriz Haddad Maia. She received a wildcard to play the Miami Open.

Playing style

Raducanu is primarily a baseline player, with an aggressive style of play.  She hits the ball early, and is adept at redirecting power down the line. Her best groundstroke is her two-handed backhand, which was described as "world-class" by former British No. 1 Anne Keothavong. Raducanu can hit her backhand one-handed with slice, to break up the pace of rallies and disrupt her opponent's rhythm, but she does not use this shot often. 

Raducanu has a strong forehand, although it is more volatile than her backhand. Raducanu's most effective serve is a wide, sliced serve, which she used during the 2021 US Open. She is known for her return of serve. She keeps opponents deep in the court by taking the ball early, and hitting hard down the line, whilst attacking short second serves by going for return winners.

Her movement, court coverage, footwork, speed, and anticipation allow her to rally and defend effectively against opponents. She blends good point construction with tactical flexibility, making it difficult for opponents to read her game. Despite typically playing from the baseline, Raducanu is a capable net player, and she possesses an effective drop shot. Raducanu is comfortable on all surfaces, although she has stated that she prefers hard courts, where she won her maiden Grand Slam title.

Endorsements
Raducanu is sponsored by Nike for clothing and shoes, and by Wilson for racquets, currently endorsing the Wilson Blade range of racquets; despite this, she uses the Wilson Steam 100 on court, painted as a Wilson Blade.

Raducanu's popularity and marketability increased considerably after her US Open victory, with sports analysts noting her potential to appeal to multiple markets. Her net worth was estimated to be £12 million in a June 2022 article. Raducanu signed with sports agency IMG while on the junior circuit and has been represented by executive Max Eisenbud. She was ranked the 12th most marketable athlete in the world in 2022 by SportsPro.

In September 2021, Raducanu became an ambassador for jewellery brand Tiffany & Co. and Dior in October 2021. In December 2021, she signed with British Airways and French bottled water brand Evian. She also starred alongside other British sportspeople and celebrities in a Christmas advertisement for sporting goods retailer Sports Direct in November 2021.

Raducanu became an ambassador for British telecommunications firm Vodafone and German automobile manufacturer Porsche in March 2022. In June 2022, Raducanu signed a four-year deal with British multinational bank HSBC. In the run-up to the 2022 Wimbledon Championships, Raducanu starred in a number of marketing campaigns for Vodafone and Evian, who are also sponsors of Wimbledon.

Awards and honours
In November 2021, Raducanu was named Sportswoman of the Year by the Sunday Times. The Guardian ranked the 2021 US Open final number 47 on their 50 best TV shows of 2021 list. Raducanu won Sportswoman of the Year and the Peter Wilson Trophy for international newcomer in December 2021, awarded by the Sports Journalists' Association. She was voted the 2021 WTA Newcomer of the Year by the WTA. On 19 December 2021, Raducanu was named the BBC Sports Personality of the Year, becoming the first female tennis player to win the trophy since Virginia Wade in 1977. She was appointed Member of the Order of the British Empire (MBE) in the 2022 New Year Honours for her contribution to tennis. 

In March 2022, Raducanu was named Sports Star of the Year at the Stylist's Remarkable Women Awards 2022. In April 2022, Raducanu won the Laureus World Sports Award for Breakthrough of the Year award. She won the Best Athlete, Women's Tennis award at the 2022 ESPY Awards.

Career statistics

Grand Slam singles performance timeline

Grand Slam tournament finals

Singles: 1 (title)

Open era records

Notes

References

External links

 
 
 
 Emma Raducanu: The Fairytale of New York, American short documentary about her 2021 US Open victory
 Emma Raducanu: Fairytale of New York, British documentary special about her 2021 US Open victory
 

2002 births
21st-century Canadian people
21st-century Canadian women
21st-century British women
BBC Sports Personality of the Year winners
Canadian expatriate sportspeople in England
British sportspeople of Chinese descent
Canadian emigrants to England
Canadian female tennis players
Canadian people of Romanian descent
Canadian sportspeople of Chinese descent
British female tennis players
British people of Romanian descent
Grand Slam (tennis) champions in women's singles
Living people
Members of the Order of the British Empire
Naturalised citizens of the United Kingdom
People educated at Newstead Wood School
People from the London Borough of Bromley
Tennis people from Greater London
Tennis players from Toronto
US Open (tennis) champions